Massachusetts House of Representatives' 5th Middlesex district in the United States is one of 160 legislative districts included in the lower house of the Massachusetts General Court. It covers parts of Middlesex County and Norfolk County. Democrat David Linsky of Natick has represented the district since 1999. Candidates running for this district seat in the 2020 Massachusetts general election include Jaymin Patel.

Towns represented
The district includes the following localities:
 part of Millis
 Natick
 Sherborn

The current district geographic boundary overlaps with those of the Massachusetts Senate's 2nd Middlesex and Norfolk district and Norfolk, Bristol and Middlesex district.

Former locale
The district previously covered Medford, circa 1872.

Representatives
 Oliver Holman, circa 1858 
 Elisha Hayden, circa 1859 
 Samuel Cutler, circa 1888 
 Albert W. Bullock, circa 1920 
 George G. Moyse, circa 1920 
 Leverett Saltonstall, circa 1929
Margaret Jane Spear, 1941-1950
 Irene K. Thresher, 1951-1961 
 Howard Whitmore, Jr., circa 1951 
 William Anthony Pickett, circa 1975 
 Paula Lewellen, 1977-1978
 Lou Nickinello, circa 1982
 Joseph M. Connolly, 1983–1991
 Douglas Stoddart, 1991–1999
 David Paul Linsky, 1999-current

See also
 List of Massachusetts House of Representatives elections
 Other Middlesex County districts of the Massachusetts House of Representatives: 1st, 2nd, 3rd, 4th, 6th, 7th, 8th, 9th, 10th, 11th, 12th, 13th, 14th, 15th, 16th, 17th, 18th, 19th, 20th, 21st, 22nd, 23rd, 24th, 25th, 26th, 27th, 28th, 29th, 30th, 31st, 32nd, 33rd, 34th, 35th, 36th, 37th
 List of Massachusetts General Courts
 List of former districts of the Massachusetts House of Representatives

Images
Portraits of legislators

References

External links
 Ballotpedia
  (State House district information based on U.S. Census Bureau's American Community Survey).

House
Government of Middlesex County, Massachusetts
Government of Norfolk County, Massachusetts